Moldovan Footballer of the Year is an annual award to Moldovan footballer, organized by Football Association of Moldova.

Players of the year

Full rankings

By titles

Teams

By position

Coach of the year

Other awards
2001
Best Goalkeeper
Denis Romanenco (Zimbru Chişinău)
Best Defender
Valeriu Catînsus (Zimbru Chişinău)
Best Midfielder
Sergiu Epureanu (Zimbru Chişinău)
Best Striker
Ruslan Barburoș (Sheriff)
Fair play
Tiligul Tiraspol
2004
Best Goalkeeper
Sebastian Huțan (Sheriff)
Best Defender
Serghei Laşcencov (Nistru)
Best Midfielder
Iulian Bursuc (Nistru)
Best Striker
 Răzvan Cociș (Sheriff)
Best female player
Olga Tanscaia
Best Futsal player
Serghei Tacot
Fair Play
Sheriff
Best Referee
Valerii Sorochin

2005
Best Goalkeeper
Serghei Pașcenco (Sheriff)
Best Defender
Alexandru Epureanu (Sheriff)
Best Midfielder
Maxim Franţuz (Zimbru Chişinău)
Best Striker
 Răzvan Cociș (Sheriff)

2007
Best Goalkeeper
Nicolae Calancea (Zimbru Chişinău)
Best Defender
Vazha Tarkhnishvili (Sheriff)
Best Midfielder
Nicolae Josan (Iskra-Stali)
Best Striker
Igor Picușceac (Tiraspol)
Team of the year
FC Dacia Chişinău
Fair Play
Sheriff
Best Referee
Vyacheslav Banar

References

Football in Moldova
Association football player of the year awards by nationality
Awards established in 1993
1993 establishments in Moldova
Moldovan awards
Annual events in Moldova